Pere Riba and Pablo Santos chose to try to not defend their 2009 title.Flavio Cipolla and Daniele Giorgini won the final against Radu Albot and Andrei Ciumac 6–3, 6–4.

Seeds

Draw

Draw

References
Main Draw

Brasov Challenger - Doubles
BRD Brașov Challenger